Salvatore Esposito may refer to:
Salvatore Esposito (actor), Italian actor
Salvatore Esposito (footballer, born 1948), Italian footballer
Salvatore Esposito (footballer, born 2000), Italian footballer
Salvatore Esposito (footballer, born 2001), American footballer